Christ the Only Way Movement was a national, inter-denominational, cooperative, and coordinated program of evangelism and church growth in the Philippines which began as a vision at the World Congress on Evangelism in 1966, was formulated at the Asia-South Pacific Congress on Evangelism in Singapore in 1968, and approved at the All Philippines Congress on Evangelism in Cainta, Rizal, in 1970.

References

Christianity in the Philippines